Songs from the Last Century is the fourth studio album by the English singer-songwriter George Michael, released on 6 December 1999 by Aegean Records and Virgin Records. Produced by Phil Ramone and George Michael, it was his only album of cover versions. It consists mainly of old jazz standards plus new interpretations of more recent popular songs, such as "Roxanne" by The Police and "Miss Sarajevo" by U2 and Brian Eno with Luciano Pavarotti. "Roxanne" was released as a single in other countries except the United Kingdom.

History
This album is the only album in Michael's entire solo catalogue to not reach number one on the UK Albums Chart, peaking at number two instead. It was kept off of the top spot by Shania Twain's Come on Over.

A music video for "Roxanne" was shot in Amsterdam, in the so-called Red District, using ordinary people, not actors, who really live their lives on the street.

Another version exists of the album's opening track, "Brother, Can You Spare a Dime?", sung by Michael with Italian tenor Luciano Pavarotti at one of his famous "Pavarotti and Friends" live shows. This version is included on the limited edition of Michael's 2006 greatest hits album, Twenty Five.

Track listing
"Brother, Can You Spare a Dime?" (E.Y. Harburg, Jay Gorney) – 4:22
"Roxanne" (Sting) – 4:11
"You've Changed" (Bill Carey, Carl Fischer) – 4:25
"My Baby Just Cares for Me" (Gus Kahn, Walter Donaldson) – 1:45
"The First Time Ever I Saw Your Face" (Ewan MacColl) – 5:19
"Miss Sarajevo" (Adam Clayton, Brian Eno, Dave Evans, Larry Mullen, Paul Hewson) – 5:11
"I Remember You" (Johnny Mercer, Victor Schertzinger) – 4:12
"Secret Love" (Paul Francis Webster, Sammy Fain) – 2:39
"Wild Is the Wind" (Dimitri Tiomkin, Ned Washington) – 4:02
"Where or When" / "It's All Right with Me" (Richard Rodgers, Lorenz Hart / Cole Porter) (Instrumental) (Hidden track) – 7:00

Personnel
Credits adapted from AllMusic.

 Abe Appleman – violin
 Diane Barere – cello
 Elena Barere – concert master, violin
 Herb Besson – trombone
 Yuri Vodovoz – violin
 Virgil Blackwell – clarinet
 Arvil Brown – violin
 Jacqui Danilow – bass guitar
 Marji Danilow – bass guitar
 Lawrence Feldman – woodwind
 Frank Filipetti – engineer, mixing
 David Finck – bass guitar
 Barry Finclair – concert master, violin
 Crystal Garner – viola
 Maura Giannini – violin
 Karen Griffen – flute
 Juliet Haffner – viola
 Corky Hale – harp
 Laura Hamilton – violin
 Joyce Hammann – violin
 Sheryl Henze – flute
 Kenneth Hitchcock – woodwind
 Jim Hynes – trumpet
 Regis Iandiorio – violin
 Jean Ingraham – violin
 Greg Jakobek – design
 Ted Jensen – mastering
 Tony Kadleck – trumpet
 Jeff Kievit – trumpet
 Chris Komer – French horn
 Carol Landon – viola
 Jeff Lang – French horn
 Kim Laskowski – bassoon
 Ann Leathers – violin
 Jeanne LeBlanc – cello
 Nancy McAlhany – violin
 Diane Lesser – oboe
 Richard Locker – cello
 Dave Mann – woodwind
 Rob Mathes – arranger, conductor, piano
 Andrew McPherson – photography
 George Michael – design, liner notes, primary artist, producer
 Jeff Mironov – guitar
 John Moses – clarinet
 Rob Mounsey – arranger, conductor, piano
 Nick Murdoch – piano
 Jan Mullen – violin
 Lewis Nash – drums
 Danny Cummings – percussion
 Phil Palmer – guitar
 Laura Oatts – violin
 Caryl Paisner – cello
 Scott Parker – assistant engineer
 Shawn Pelton – drums
 Steve Walters – bass guitar
 Charles Pillow – woodwind
 Sue Pray – viola
 Phil Ramone – liner notes, producer
 Tim Ries – woodwind
 Marcus Rojas – tuba
 Roger Rosenberg – woodwind
 Stacey Shames – harp
 Mark Orrin Shuman – cello
 Pamela Sklar – flute
 Andy Snitzer – woodwind
 Jason Stasium – mixing
 Byron Stripling – trumpet
 Marti Sweet – violin
 Donna Tecco – violin
 David Tofani – woodwind
 Carol Webb – violin
 Ellen Westermann – cello
 Torrie Zito – arranger

Charts

Weekly charts

Year-end charts

Certifications and sales

Notes

References

1999 albums
George Michael albums
Covers albums
Albums arranged by Torrie Zito
Albums produced by Phil Ramone
Traditional pop albums